Bathytoma profundis is a species of sea snail, a marine gastropod mollusk in the family Conidae, the cone snails and their allies.

Description
The length of the shell attains 20 mm.

Distribution
This marine species occurs off Australia (New South Wales, Queensland, Victoria) and New Zealand.

References

 Laseron, C. 1954. Revision of the New South Wales Turridae (Mollusca). Australian Zoological Handbook. Sydney : Royal Zoological Society of New South Wales 1-56, pls 1-12.

profundis
Gastropods described in 1954